The Driedaagse van Antwerpen was a short-lived Belgian stage cycling race organized for the last time in 1960. 

The course was situated in the Antwerp Province. It also included a team time trial, which was held in the city park (Stadspark) of Antwerp.

Rik Van Looy won at least one stage in each edition, except for 1955.

Winners

References 

Cycle races in Belgium
1954 establishments in Belgium
Defunct cycling races in Belgium
Recurring sporting events established in 1954
Recurring sporting events disestablished in 1960
1960 disestablishments in Belgium